Jalan Chikus (Perak state route A122) is a major road in Perak, Malaysia.

List of junctions

Chikus